Mads Glæsner (born 18 October 1988 in Tårnby) is a Danish swimmer. He participated at the 2008 Summer Olympics in the 400 metre freestyle and the 1500 metre freestyle disciplines. His swimming club is Vallensbæk-VAT but he trains at the National Training Center in Copenhagen.

He competed at the 2012 Summer Olympics in the 400 m freestyle and the 4 x 200 m freestyle relay.

In June 2013, Glæsner was stripped of a gold and bronze medal from the 2012 World Short Course Championships after testing positive for levomethamphetamine.

However, upon appeal to the Court of Arbitration for Sport, Glaesner's 1500-metre freestyle gold medal was reinstated based on the fact that a test after that race, two days after his initial positive test following the 400-metre free, was clean. He still forfeited the 400-metre freestyle bronze, which he did not appeal.

Since then, he has competed at the 2016 Summer Olympics, in the 400 m freestyle.

References

External links 
 
 

1988 births
Living people
Danish male freestyle swimmers
Olympic swimmers of Denmark
Swimmers at the 2008 Summer Olympics
Swimmers at the 2012 Summer Olympics
Swimmers at the 2016 Summer Olympics
Medalists at the FINA World Swimming Championships (25 m)
Danish sportspeople in doping cases
Doping cases in swimming
People from Tårnby Municipality
Sportspeople from the Capital Region of Denmark
20th-century Danish people
21st-century Danish people